Jonna Eva-Maj Adlerteg (born 6 June 1995) is a Swedish gymnast. She won the bronze medal on bars at the 2010 Summer Youth Olympics in Singapore. Adlerteg competed at the 2012 Olympic Games in London and the 2020 Olympic Games in Tokyo, becoming the second Swedish gymnast during the 21st century to qualify for the Olympics after Veronica Wagner. Adlerteg took Sweden's first medal in gymnastics in over 50 years when she won the silver medal on the uneven bars at the 2013 Europe Championships.

Career

2010 
Adlerteg represented Sweden at the 2010 Summer Youth Olympics. Adlerteg finished 10th in the all-around final. She finished 8th on beam and 7th on floor. Adlerteg's best result was on the uneven bars, where she won bronze behind Viktoria Komova and Tan Sixin. Her bronze was one of five medals that Sweden won at the 2010 Summer Youth Olympics.

2011 
Adlerteg competed at the 2011 European Championships. As the youngest competitor, she finished 23rd in the all-around. At the Ghent World Cup, she finished 4th on bars and 6th on floor. Adlerteg finished 64th in the all-around qualification for the 2011 World Championships with a score of 51.966.

2012 
Adlerteg placed 42nd at the Test Event, qualifying her a spot for the 2012 Summer Olympics. She was the second Swedish gymnast during the 21st century to qualify for the Olympics after Veronica Wagner. Adlerteg finished 16th with the Swedish team at the 2012 European Championships. At the World Cup in Ghent, Adlerteg finished 4th on bars.

Adlerteg represented Sweden at the 2012 Summer Olympics. She finished 39th in the all-around qualification with a score of 52.199.

2013 
Adlerteg won a silver medal on the uneven bars at the 2013 European Championships behind Aliya Mustafina. It was Sweden's first medal in gymnastics in over 50 years.

2014 
Adlerteg competed at the 2014 World Artistic Gymnastics Championships.

2015 
Jonna started the season at the 2015 Cottbus World Cup and won the bars final.

At the 2015 European Artistic Gymnastics Championships, in April 2015, she qualified to the all-around final. She sustained an ACL injury on her first event, the floor, and she was forced to withdraw from the competition.

2016
In March 2016, news surfaced that Adlerteg had ruptured a meniscus, and would be out for the 2016 Olympics.

References

Swedish female artistic gymnasts
1995 births
Sportspeople from Västerås
Gymnasts at the 2010 Summer Youth Olympics
Living people
Gymnasts at the 2012 Summer Olympics
Olympic gymnasts of Sweden
Gymnasts at the 2020 Summer Olympics
21st-century Swedish women